Completamente Enamorados is a ballad written by Adelio Cogliati, Piero Cassano and Eros Ramazzotti. Originally titled "Un Nuovo Amore" ("A New Love"), the song was performed by Italian singer-songwriter Ramazzotti in his second album Nuovi eroi, released in 1986. Two years later the song was re-recorded in Spanish on the Spanish language version of his album Música Es, released in 1988. Two years later it was covered by Puerto Rican singer Chayanne, and this version was released as the first single of his album Tiempo de Vals (1990). The song peaked at number one in the Billboard Hot Latin Tracks chart (now Top Latin Songs) in late 1990 and was nominated for Pop Song of the Year at the Lo Nuestro Awards.

Chayanne version of the song debuted in the Billboard Hot Latin Tracks chart at number 28 in the week of September 8, 1990, climbing to the top ten three weeks later. "Completamente Enamorados" peaked at number-one on October 20, 1990, replacing "Peligroso Amor" by Chilean performer Myriam Hernández and being succeeded by "Entrégate" by Mexican performer Luis Miguel five weeks later.

Music video
A music video was shot in 1990 in New York City. It was included in Grandes Exitos DVD.

See also
 List of number-one Billboard Hot Latin Tracks of 1990

References

1986 singles
1988 singles
1990 singles
1986 songs
1988 songs
Eros Ramazzotti songs
Chayanne songs
Songs written by Eros Ramazzotti
Italian-language songs
Spanish-language songs
CBS Discos singles
1980s ballads
1990s ballads
Pop ballads
Rock ballads